Prospect is a home rule-class city in Jefferson and Oldham counties in the U.S. state of Kentucky.  The Jefferson County portion is a part of the Louisville Metro government. The population was 4,698 at the time 2010 census. It is one of the wealthiest communities in Kentucky.

History

The area was first known as "Sand Hill" when it was settled by farmers in the late 18th century. The present community grew up around the "Prospect" railroad station erected by the Louisville, Harrods Creek and Westport Railway . The name referred either to the view from the top of the hill or the expected completion of the line (which  owing to the Long Depression  never did reach Westport and collapsed into bankruptcy in 1879). When the post office was established in 1886, the local postmaster named it "Wilhoyte" in his own honor, but the community corrected this within the month.

Although a few luxury residences existed in the area from the late 19th century and the Louisville Railway Company offered hourly electrified-rail trolleys along the former LHC&W line after 1904, it was largely agricultural until the mid-1960s when large, high-end subdivisions were built in the area, most notably Hunting Creek, which included a golf course. Prospect incorporated as a city in 1974.

Geography
Prospect is located in northeastern Jefferson County at  (38.340126, -85.605627). A small portion of the city extends north into Oldham County. The city is bordered by the Ohio River to the northwest, by U.S. Route 42 to the southwest, and by Harrods Creek, a tributary of the Ohio, to the south. US-42 is the primary transportation artery running through the area, leading southwest  to downtown Louisville and northeast  to Bedford.

The postal address of "Prospect" (ZIP Code 40059) covers an area far beyond the city limits, extending east as far as the Norton Commons development in the Worthington community.

Demographics

As of the 2000 census, there were 4,657 people, 1,732 households, and 1,423 families residing in the city. The racial makeup of the city was 92.91% White, 3.39% African American, 0.26% Native American, 2.06% Asian, 0.02% Pacific Islander, 0.21% from other races, and 1.14% from two or more races. Hispanic or Latino of any race were 0.64% of the population.

There were 1,732 households, out of which 38.0% had children under the age of 18 living with them, 76.3% were married couples living together, 4.4% had a female householder with no husband present, and 17.8% were non-families. 15.8% of all households were made up of individuals, and 5.1% had someone living alone who was 65 years of age or older. The average household size was 2.69 and the average family size was 3.01.

In the city the population was spread out, with 27.5% under the age of 18, 3.7% from 18 to 24, 23.3% from 25 to 44, 35.5% from 45 to 64, and 10.1% who were 65 years of age or older. The median age was 43 years. For every 100 females, there were 97.2 males. For every 100 females age 18 and over, there were 94.8 males.

The median income for a household in the city was $111,170, and the median income for a family was $124,131. Males had a median income of $100,000 versus $42,159 for females. The per capita income for the city was $51,469. 1.5% of the population and 0.8% of families were below the poverty line.

See also
 List of cities and towns along the Ohio River

References

External links
City of Prospect official website
"Prospect: Nature's Endowments Seduced Settlers; Country Store Was a Focal Point that Served Men of Plows and Power" — Article by Kay Stewart of The Courier-Journal

Cities in Jefferson County, Kentucky
Cities in Oldham County, Kentucky
Kentucky populated places on the Ohio River
Cities in Kentucky